Perlimpinpin is one of the French names under which Rumpelstiltskin is known.

Other uses
  is a French-language idiom with a meaning analoguous to snake oil
  is a song from singer Barbara (1930–1997)
 Perlimpinpin is a character in the 1867 chamber opera Le dernier sorcier (The Last Sorcerer)